Ronald Edward Hood (born 1969) is a former Republican legislator in the Ohio House of Representatives. He represented the 78th District. He also represented, at various times, both the 57th and the 91st districts. Hood was a candidate in the 2021 Ohio's 15th congressional district special election and is a candidate in the 2022 Ohio gubernatorial election.

Education
A graduate of the Fisher College of Business at Ohio State University, Hood earned a Bachelor of Science degree in Business Administration in 1991. He had dual majors in marketing and economics.

Political career
In 1992, Hood ran for an open seat in the Ohio House of Representatives, but lost by a narrow margin. In 1994, Hood ran again and was elected to represent the 57th district, a position he held for three terms. In 2005, he won a close race for the 91st district with a 5.28% margin. He has served on both the House Commerce and Labor Committee and the House Criminal Justice Committee.

In 2019 Ron Hood and Candice Keller sponsored legislation that would ban abortion in Ohio and require doctors to "reimplant" ectopic pregnancies into the uterus, which is not medically possible, or face charges for "abortion murder". Hood sponsored a heartbeat bill in 2018 that did not pass. A later heartbeat bill introduced in the senate in 2019 was signed into law but did not take effect due to court action.

On February 1, 2022, Hood announced that he would run for governor in the 2022 Ohio gubernatorial election.

Personal life

In 2001, Hood married Michal Marie Dean of Xenia, Ohio. The couple have 5 children and divorced in January 2020. Mr. Hood resides near Ashville, Ohio.

References

External links 

|-

|-

1969 births
21st-century American politicians
Candidates in the 2021 United States elections
Living people
Republican Party members of the Ohio House of Representatives
Ohio State University Fisher College of Business alumni
People from Ashville, Ohio